Julião Francisco Gaspar, nicknamed Vermelhinho, (born 28 March 1990) is an Angolan handball player for Interclube and the Angolan national team.

He participated at the 2017 World Men's Handball Championship.

References

1990 births
Living people
Angolan male handball players
African Games silver medalists for Angola
African Games medalists in handball
Competitors at the 2015 African Games